The 55th New Brunswick Legislative Assembly was created following a general election in 2003 and was dissolved on August 18, 2006.

Leadership

The speaker from its first meeting until February 14, 2006 was Bev Harrison who had served as speaker in the 54th Assembly as well.  Harrison resigned from the post to join the cabinet.

Michael Malley was elected speaker by acclamation on March 28, 2006 and served in that role until the assembly was dissolved.

Premier Bernard Lord led the government for the whole of the life of the assembly.

Shawn Graham led the opposition for the whole of the life of the assembly.

From its forming to her resignation on October 13, 2005, Elizabeth Weir led the third party New Democrats.  Following her resignation, the New Democrats were no longer represented in the assembly.

Members

All were elected in the 35th general election held on June 9, 2003 except for Victor Boudreau who was elected in a by-election on October 4, 2004 and Ed Doherty who was elected in a by-election on November 14, 2005.

The standings were changed further on January 13, 2006, when Frank Branch left the Liberal caucus to sit as an independent; and on February 17, 2006, when then Progressive Conservative MLA Michael Malley crossed the floor to sit as an independent thus putting Bernard Lord's government into a minority situation.  Malley, while serving as speaker, changed his affiliation back to Progressive Conservative on April 13, 2006.  Some controversy arose following this as following the 2003 election, the House unanimously passed a motion requiring the Opposition Liberals to pair a member with the speaker during meetings of committees of the whole in order to maintain the government majority in such situations.  The Opposition argued that there was no precedent for a speaker to cross the floor and therefore, they did not recognize that a majority government existed and would not honour this motion under the circumstances.  The House voted on May 30, 2006 to express confidence in the Speaker and therefore, implicitly, approve of his change of affiliation.  From that date forward, the Liberals accepted Malley as a Progressive Conservative.

Members at dissolution

Bold denotes a member of the cabinet.
Italics denotes a party leader
† denotes the Speaker

Former members

Bernard Richard, a Liberal first elected in the 1991 election, represented Shediac-Cap-Pelé from the formation of the assembly until his resignation on November 26, 2003.
Elizabeth Weir, a New Democrat first elected in the 1991 election, represented Saint John Harbour from the formation of the assembly until her resignation on October 13, 2005.

See also
2003 New Brunswick general election
Legislative Assembly of New Brunswick

References 
 Elections in New Brunswick 1984–2006, Elections New Brunswick (pdf)

Terms of the New Brunswick Legislature
2003 establishments in New Brunswick
2006 disestablishments in New Brunswick